Steven Weissman (born June 4, 1968, in California) is an alternative cartoonist best known for his offbeat and bizarre explorations of childhood friendships. His work has been published by Fantagraphics, Retrofit Comics, and Vice.

Selected bibliography 
 Tykes, 1997 (Alternative Comics)
 Yikes, 1998 (Alternative Comics)
 Lemon Kids, 1999 (Alternative Comics)
 Champs, 1999 (Fantagraphics Books) 
 Fichtre!, 2000 (Amok éditions) 
 Don't Call Me Stupid', 2001 (Fantagraphics Books) 
 White Flower Day, 2002 (Fantagraphics Books) 
 The Kid Firechief, 2004 (Fantagraphics Books) 
 Chewing Gum in Church, 2006 (Fantagraphics Books) 
 Mean, 2007 (Fantagraphics) 
 Chocolate Cheeks, 2010 (Fantagraphics Books) 
 Barack Hussein Obama, 2012 (Fantagraphics Books) 
 Mutiny on the Mousey, 2014 (Stinckers)
 Butter and Blood, 2015 (Retrofit/Big Planet) 
 Looking for America's Dog'', 2016 (Fantagraphics Books)

References

External links 
 Weissman's blog

1968 births
Alternative cartoonists
Artists from Los Angeles
Harvey Award winners for Best New Talent
Living people